The College of Liberal Arts and Sciences (LAS) is the largest college of the University of Illinois Urbana-Champaign. The college was established in 1913 through the merger of the College of Literature and Arts and the College of Science. The college offers seventy undergraduate majors, as well as master's and Ph.D. Programs. As of 2020, there are nearly 12,000 Undergraduate Students and 2,500 Graduate students attending the College of Liberal Arts and Sciences.

Campus 
LAS is home to many historic spaces located at the center of campus, featuring cutting-edge classrooms and laboratories in many of their 60+ buildings. Over half of the buildings on the Main Quad fall under the College of LAS, such as Altgeld Hall, Noyes Laboratory, the Foreign Languages Building, and the Natural History Building. The historic and well-traversed Lincoln Hall serves as the college’s headquarters—an average of 5,000 students passed through the building every weekday in Fall 2019. 

The college has led multiple major renovations of its buildings in recent years: Lincoln Hall underwent a $60 million renovation, reopening to the community in 2012. The entire exterior of the building was restored, including 30 terracotta panels depicting quotes and portraits from Abraham Lincoln’s life. The theater was returned to its original look by using historical colors and preserving decorative ends of seats, tablets, and frescoes. In the entrance foyer, the barrel vault ceiling, Gettysburg Address tablet, marble floors, and pillars were restored. Classrooms were renovated to include updated audio/visual technology. As renovations were completed, a balance of modernizing spaces while keeping historical details of the building were considered, alongside making the building eco-friendly. 

The Natural History Building underwent a $72 million renovation from 2014-2017, reopening in 2017 with new classrooms, laboratories, and meeting spaces. Because of its history as the university’s third oldest building and its place on the National Register of Historic Places, careful planning focused on preserving the building’s original details. The building’s exterior includes restored masonry, tile, and marble. Care was also placed in incorporating green technologies. The project reused woodwork, doors, and windows while implementing water-efficient technologies. In 2019, the building received Leadership in Energy and Environmental Design Gold status for its renovation being conducted in an environmentally efficient manner. 

The College of LAS has embarked on a $192 million project to restore and renovate Altgeld Hall and replace Illini Hall with a new building. This project will provide students and faculty collaborative spaces that are essential for learning and discovery in the 21st century and make both buildings accessible to all students. The project will blend the history of Altgeld Hall with modern spaces and is targeting LEED Platinum certification for Illini Hall and LEED Silver certification for Altgeld Hall. Illini Hall construction is expected to be complete in 2024, and Altgeld Hall renovations are expected to be complete by 2025.

Academics
The College of LAS is home to 37 academic departments, five schools, and nine centers and institutes, with 14,500 students pursuing more than 70 majors, 60 minors, and numerous certificates. Majors and minors span social sciences, math, humanities, and physical sciences. Among the 30 most popular undergraduate majors at the university, nearly half are in LAS, with psychology, economics, and molecular & cellular biology in the top five. The college offers about 1,500 different classes each semester. More than 99% of all students at the University of Illinois’ Urbana campus take at least one class in the college.

Rankings 
Within the College of Liberal Arts & Sciences, there are several programs that rank high in the nation according to U.S. News & World Report. LAS’s chemistry and psychology departments are ranked in the top 10 nationally, and other departments including biology, chemical engineering, economics, English, history, and mathematics are ranked in the top 30 nationally.

Scholarships 
The College of LAS awards about $675,000 in scholarships every year with 190 scholarships being offered at the college level. LAS’s Lincoln Scholars is the college’s largest scholarship initiative, offering 60 academically strong students with a potential value of $20,000 over four years. LAS students have also been awarded numerous prestigious scholarships, including Fulbright scholarships, Boren Scholarships and Fellowships for international study, Marshall Scholarships, Critical Language Scholarships, and Barry Goldwater Scholarships.

Research 
The College of LAS annually receives approximately $70 million in grant funding for faculty research. All LAS faculty members are affiliated with an interdisciplinary research institute, and many are established leaders in them. LAS faculty have been honored with various awards such as the National Medal of Science, Guggenheim Fellowships, National Endowment for the Humanities Fellowships, and memberships to the National Academy of Science and American Academy of Arts and Sciences.

There are numerous research facilities associated with LAS:

 Beckman Institute for Advanced Science and Technology
 Dedicated to research in neuroscience, materials science, imagine, language and literacy, and bioengineering. 
 Jeffery Moore, the Murchinson-Mallory Professor of Chemistry, stands as the director. 
 Carl R. Woese Institute for Genomic Biology 
 Dedicated to research in biology, cellular and metabolic engineering, and genome technology. 
 Gener Robinson, the Swanlund Chair in Entomology, stands as the director.
 Humanities Research Institute 
 Dedicated to research in the humanities, arts, and social sciences. 
 Antoinetter Burton, the Swanlund Endowed Chair in History, stands as the director.
 Institute for Sustainability, Energy, and Environment 
 Dedicated to research in sustainability, energy, and environmental needs. 
 Evan DeLucia, the G. William Arends Professor of Biology, stands as the director.
 Interdisciplinary Health Sciences Institute 
 Dedicated to faculty-driven research in cancer, precision medicine, and neuroscience. 
 Neal Cohen, a professor of psychology, stands as the director. 
 National Center for Supercomputing Applications
 Dedicated to digitally-enabled research in high-performance computing data-driven science and provides resources for computing, data, networking, and visualization.

Faculty
Accounting for ⅓ of all faculty on the Urbana campus, the College of LAS is home to over 600 tenure-track faculty members that lead in their fields. The college also staffs more than 250 specialized, non-tenure track faculty members who teach and advise students, and contribute to research. Nearly one in four LAS faculty members are honored with named appointments.

Alumni
There are more than 178,000 accomplished LAS alumni, including Nobel Laureates and 9 Pulitzer Prize winners. Many alumni serve actively on the LAS Alumni Association Board, which has served the College for more than 30 years.

Notable alumni 

 Susan Avery (MS 1974, physics; PhD 1978, atmospheric sciences) - senior fellow at the Consortium for Ocean Leadership. 
 David Harold Blackwell (AB 1938; MS 1939; PhD 1941, mathematics) - the first African-American elected to the National Academy of Sciences.
 Maudelle Bousfield (AB 1906, mathematics and astronomy) - the first African-American woman to graduate from the University of Illinois.
 St. Elmo Brady (MS 1914; PhD 1916, chemistry) - the first African-American to earn a doctoral degree in chemistry.
 Nancy Brinker (BA 1968, sociology) - founder of Susan G. Komen for the Cure.
 Lin Chuan (MS 1982; PhD 1984, economics) - former premier of Taiwan.
 Rafael Correa (MS 1999; PhD 2001, economics) - former president of Ecuador.
 Roxanne Decyk (BA 1973, English literature) - Shell executive.
 Edward Adelbert Doisy (BA 1914; MS 1916, chemistry) - Nobel Prize winner in medicine and physiology.
 David Herbert Donald (MA 1942; PhD 1946, history) - Pulitzer Prize in Biography winner.
 Jean Driscoll (BA 1991, speech communication) - Paralympic athlete.
 Bob Dudley (BS 1978, chemical engineering) - former BP executive.
 Robert Holley (BA 1942, chemistry) - Nobel Prize winner in medicine and physiology.
 Robert Johnson (BA 1968, teaching of social studies) - co-founder of BET
 Edwin G. Krebs (BA 1940, chemistry) - Nobel Prize winner in medicine and physiology.
 Lynn Morley Martin (BA 1960, teaching of English) - American politician.
 Wendell Stanley (MS 1927; PhD 1929, chemistry) - Nobel Prize winner in chemistry.

References

External links
 Official website

Liberal arts colleges at universities in the United States
Educational institutions established in 1913
Liberal Arts and Sciences
1913 establishments in Illinois